Aloeides griseus is a butterfly in the family Lycaenidae. It is found in Zambia.

References

Butterflies described in 1921
Aloeides
Endemic fauna of Zambia
Butterflies of Africa